Grace is an unincorporated community in Carroll County, in the U.S. state of Missouri.

History
A post office called Grace was established in 1893, and remained in operation until 1902. The community was named after a nearby church.

References

Unincorporated communities in Carroll County, Missouri
Unincorporated communities in Missouri